Adaline Hohf Beery (Hohf; after marriage, Beery, sometimes misspelled Berry; December 20, 1859 – February 24, 1929) was an American author, newspaper and magazine editor, songbook compiler, as well as a hymnwriter. Born into a Pennsylvania Dutch community, her first job after graduating from Mount Morris College in Illinois was as a compositor in a printing office. She served as the editor of The Golden Dawn magazine and The Young Disciple child's paper; compiled a song-book, Gospel Chimes; and was employed by the Brethren Publishing House. Beery died in 1929.

Early life and education
Adaline Hohf was born in Hanover, Pennsylvania, December 20, 1859. She was of mixed ancestry. Her father, Michael Hohf (1821–1881), was of Dutch extraction, and her mother, whose maiden name was Elizabeth Bucher (1821–1914), was of Swiss ancestry. Her siblings were Emanuel (1853–1864) and Martha (1864–1948). Born in a Pennsylvania Dutch community, the Pennsylvania German language was the first she learned to speak. She removed with her parents, at the age of four years, to Frederick, Maryland, where she spent her childhood days amid the rural sights and sounds along the Linganore Creek. In 1870, her family removed to Iowa, where, as a school-girl in her teens, she first attempted verse.

She completed the academic course of Mount Morris College in 1882.

Career
A talent for composition began its development in her teens. Sketches, in the form of both poetry and prose, found their way into the local papers. She gave no particular evidence of a tendency to rhyme until 1884, at which time she resided in Illinois, when the death of a friend called forth a memorial tribute, which received such commendation from personal friends as to encourage her to continue to work in verse. Poems were frequently written by her afterward.

About six months after graduation from Mount Morris College, she entered a printing office as compositor, working there more than four years. In May, 1885, Beery undertook the editing of The Golden Dawn, an excellent but short-lived magazine published in Huntingdon, Pennsylvania.

On June 20, 1888, she married William Beery (1852–1956), an instructor in vocal music, and soon after rendered him valuable assistance in compiling an excellent song-book, Gospel Chimes, writing hymns and some music for it. She and her husband were located in Huntingdon, where she edited a child's paper known as The Young Disciple. Later, the husband and wife worked together in the Brethren Publishing House in Elgin, Illinois.

Personal life

Her family consisted of a son, Leon Felix Beery, born in February 1891, and a daughter, Judith Garber, born in 1897. Beery died on February 24, 1929, in Kane, Illinois. She was buried at Bluff City Cemetery in Elgin.

Selected works

Books

 Poems of a decade, 1897
 The rostrum : a collection of original recitations, dialogues, motion songs, etc. for day-schools and Christmas entertainments, 1900
 Christmas rainbow; a play for four girls and four boys six or seven years old., 1908
 A home for the Christ, an exercise for eleven boys., 1908

Hymns
She wrote the music for the hymn "The Holy Bible", and the lyrics for many more hymns:

 Abide with me, my Savior dear
 Bless Jehovah, O my soul, praise
 Bountiful Giver of goodness
 Come, gather, all tribes and all nations
 Come to the Master of the feast
 Do you purpose in your heart to be good and true
 Draw me, Jesus, close to thee
 Father, in thy golden kingdom
 Father, we would think on thee
 God of might, truth and right
 God sends the sunshine and the rain
 Hail, blessed Trinity, low here we bow
 Happy are the birds and flowers
 Hark, from every village
 Have you heard the master's call Sounding clear
 Hear the voice of the Master proclaiming to all
 Here we come, with songs of gladness
 I come to taste my Father's grace
 I learned a precious secret
 I long had been wandering
 I'll praise thee, Lord for length
 I'll sing of the Savior
 In all my thoughts, in all my ways
 In the days long ago
 In the Lord's good promises my heart is glad
 I've read of mansions in the skies
 Jesus, precious Friend and Savior
 Jesus, royal, heavenly Friend
 Jesus stands and offers comfort
 Leave all to him, O troubled soul
 Let your face be like the daybreak
 Lift up Immanuel's banner
 Lo a gleam from yonder heaven
 Lo what song breaks on the morning
 O angel with mission of healing
 O bring your best songs to our Savior
 O fair was the vision that flooded my soul
 O hark, what sounds are floating
 O mansions of beauty in heaven
 O mourn not for friends who have reached the bright shore
 O soul in the shadow of sin
 O Spirit holy, flame divineO sweet was the song
 O the dear love of a Savior and King
 O thou sacred book
 Onward, happy children
 Onward to the conflict, soldiers of the King
 Open your heart, brother
 Quickly and joyfully gather we now
 Rally, Christian workers, lift the standard high
 Rally to our standard, those who love the right
 Rows of cheerful faces
 See, the morn is brightening in the eastern sky
 Some day among the whiterobed throng
 Standing on the great King's highway
 Tell me the story of Jesus over and over again
 Tell of the love of our Savior and King
 The sun will pale before him
 There's a song of gladness in my heart today
 There's a Stranger stands
 They tell me that showers of blessing
 Through the world we're traveling
 Up, my brother, duty calls you
 Upon a gloomy hilltop, there fell
 Upon this holy Sabbath day
 We are happy little children
 We are little travelers Through the world
 We can sing of Christ the Lord
 We come to thee, O Holy Christ
 We come to worship thee, O holy one
 We come with banners waving
 We have come to sing the praise
 We sing of Christ our Savior
 We'll sing a pleasant song for our Children's Day
 We're a band of happy children, In a world of sin
 We're a temperance legion marching
 We're coming to work for the Master
 We're marching with banners all waving and bright
 When Jesus passed the figtree
 When Jesus was asked by his servants one day
 When my Savior speaks to me
 When weary walking the highway of life
 Why do you tarry, O sinner
 Why will you struggle, dear brother

References

Attribution

Bibliography

External links
 
 

1859 births
1929 deaths
19th-century American poets
19th-century American women writers
19th-century American newspaper editors
20th-century American poets
20th-century American women writers
20th-century American non-fiction writers
American people of Swiss descent
American people of Dutch descent
American women poets
People from Hanover, Pennsylvania
American hymnwriters
Mount Morris College alumni
American women non-fiction writers
Women newspaper editors
Wikipedia articles incorporating text from A Woman of the Century